The Nalik language is spoken by 5,000 or so people, based in 17 villages in Kavieng District, New Ireland, Papua New Guinea.  It is an Austronesian language and member of the New Ireland group of languages with a subject–verb–object (SVO) phrase structure. New Ireland languages are among the first Papua New Guinea languages recorded by Westerners.

Laxudumau, spoken in the village of Lakudumau, is transitional to Kara, but is not intelligible to speakers of Nalik.

Speakers 
Speakers of Nalik reside in a series of villages in northern central New Ireland.

In the past, Lugagon, Fesoa, and Fessoa have been used to reference Nalik, which are all names of villages in the region.

Phonology

Consonants 
A Nalik phonology analysis was developed by Clive H. Beaumont.

Grammar

Nalik consonant system 
Additionally, the voiceless fricatives become voiced.

When immediately preceded by a vowel the following consonants change their voicing:

 and  become [β] (written as v)

 becomes 

 becomes [ɣ] (written as x)

The following are examples of these characteristics:

Nouns 
Nouns in Nalik are categorized as being uncountable or countable nouns. Nouns can be part of a noun phrase or can be an independent subject referenced in a verbal complex. When used as subjects, some uncountable nouns are co-referential with plural subject markers; however, those are the exceptions and are usually marked with singular subject markers. With uncountable nouns, numerical markers cannot be used. Countable nouns, however, can be singular or plural and can be modified by numerical markers.

Personal pronouns 

Variations in the third person non-singular pronouns are attributed to rapid speech and regional variants. In rapid speech  often becomes . In the Northern Eastern Coast  is the variant used. In the South East Coast  is the variant used.  is used primarily by younger speakers from all areas.

Personal pronouns can notably be utilized in the same way as related nouns such as 'a woman' being replaced with 'she'.

  ('The woman will come.')
  ('She will come.')

Numbers 
The Nalik counting system is reflective of using one's hand to count and indicative of the style in which they do so. They begin with an open palm and bring individual fingers down per digit counted and the action of doing so is shown in their counting system. As such, the Nalik counting system contains elements of a base-five counting system; however, when proceeding past ten, the counting system uses elements of base ten.

The word for the number five, can be analyzed as the phrase :  being a third-person indicator,  being a negation particle, and  meaning 'hand'. It can, therefore, be translated to 'no hand' as all fingers have been lowered.

The numbers six through nine are also representative of this pattern. In these numbers, the phrase describes the act of lowering additional fingers.

Past ten, the counting system starts to use combinations of ten in multiples of a number one to nine. Higher numbers in the hundreds use "ten squared" as a base.

Wh-questions 
Interrogatives in Nalik occur in the same position as adverbs, prepositional phrases, and nouns, and bear the same grammatical relations. Several interrogatives are built off the base word , meaning 'what'.

Word order 
The Nalik language features an SVO sentence structure that is common to the languages of the New Ireland–Tolai languages.

Notes

Bibliography
 

Languages of New Ireland Province
Meso-Melanesian languages
Subject–verb–object languages